Jammu Janbaz is a Pakistani franchise cricket team that competes in the Kashmir Premier League. It was founded in 2022 after the inaugural edition of Kashmir Premier League. The franchise is owned by Kingdom Valley. The franchise represents Jammu which is the winter capital of Jammu and Kashmir.

History

2022 season

A few days after the conclusion of the 2021 KPL the President of the KPL, Arif Malik, announced that a seventh team named Jammu Janbaz would be added to the KPL in order to pay tribute to the martyrs of Jammu. In July 2022, it was announced that former Pakistani captain, Shahid Afridi, would join Jammu Janbaz as a mentor. On 15 July 2022, it was announced that Sharjeel Khan would join Jammu Janbaz as their icon player.

Team identity

Current squad

Captains

Coaches

Result summary

Head-to-head record

Statistics

Most runs 

Source: Cricinfo, Last updated: 22 August 2022

Most wickets 

Source: Cricinfo, Last Updated: 22 August 2022

References

Kashmir Premier League (Pakistan)
Cricket teams in Pakistan